Camp Chi is a Jewish summer camp in Lake Delton, Wisconsin. Chi caters mainly for Jewish children, grades 3 to 11.

History 

Chi was founded in 1921 as the Chicago Hebrew Institute by the Jewish Community Centers of Chicago. In the 1940s and beyond, the camp was supported by fundraising efforts by the Jewish Auxiliary and the Institute Woman's Club via luncheons.

In the 1950s, the camp had a summer population of 1500 children between the ages of 5 and 16, and it provided for free summer events and trips to Jewish elderly. It moved to its present site in Lake Delton, Wisconsin in 1957 and became a co-ed camp. The 600 acre facility features summer cabins, two pools, tennis courts, a horseback riding stable, athletic fields, a large winterized gymnasium facility, a year-round conference center and miles of magnificent trails. The director of Camp Chi is Jon Levin.

Villages 
Camp Chi is divided by grade into the following groups:
 Garinim (two-week 3rd grade)
 Yeladim (two-week 4th and 5th grade)
 Shoreshim (4th and 5th grade)
 Tsofim (6th grade)
 Kadima (two-week 6th and 7th grade)
 Chalutzim (7th grade)
 Habonim (8th grade)
 PNW (Pacific Northwest Trip) (9th and 10th Grade)
 Noar (9th and 10th grade)
 SIT (Staff In Training) (8 weeks) (11th grade)
 Avodah (Ages 18–22 for people with developmental or physical disabilities) 
 Take Two (Two weekers that can extend to 3 or 4 weeks if they want to during the session) (For Shoreshim, Tsofim, Chalutzim, Habonim, Noar, Avodah)

Keshet and Avodah
Keshet, a program for children with developmental or physical disabilities, began in 2009. Avodah, a work program for special needs adults, began in 2012.

Activities

Athletics
 Archery
 Baseball
 Basketball
 Fitness Training
 Flag Football
 Frisbee Golf
 Gaga
 Ice Skating
 Soccer
 Softball
 Tennis
 Volleyball
 Ultimate Frisbee

Aquatics
 Aqua Aerobics
 Boating
 Canoeing
 Fishing
 Funyaking
 Knee Boarding
 Mermaiding
 Paddle Boarding
 Sailing
 Swimming
 Tubing
 Water Basketball
 Wake Boarding
 Water Skiing

Arts
 Arts & Crafts
 Ceramics & Pottery
 Digital Photography
 Glass Fusing
 Jewelry Making
 Judaic art
 Mosaics
 Nature Crafts
 Painting & Drawing
 Textiles
 Woodworking

Outdoor Adventure
 Aerial Adventure Park
 Horseback Riding
 Mountain Biking
 Outdoor Cooking
 Rock Climbing
 Ropes Course (High & Low)

Media
 Electronic DJ
 Film
 Music Production
 Radio
 Recording Studio

Performing Arts
 Camp Play
 Dance (Hip Hop, Poms & Jazz)
 Drama
 Music (Jam Band, Guitar, Songwriting)

Even More!
 CHIne On (Volunteering)
 Israeli Culture

References

External links
Official website

Wisconsin Dells, Wisconsin
Chi